Aldford is a former civil parish, now in the parish of Aldford and Saighton, in Cheshire West and Chester, England. It contains 26 buildings that are recorded in the National Heritage List for England as designated listed buildings. The parish lies within the estate of Eaton Hall. The major settlement is the village of Aldford, and many of the buildings in the village were built for the Grosvenor family of Eaton Hall. Most of the listed buildings are located in or near the village.

Key

Buildings

See also
Listed buildings in Buerton
Listed buildings in Churton by Aldford
Listed buildings in Coddington
Listed buildings in Eaton
Listed buildings in Eccleston
Listed buildings in Golborne David
Listed buildings in Handley
Listed buildings in Huntington
Listed buildings in Huxley
Listed buildings in Poulton
Listed buildings in Pulford
Listed buildings in Rowton
Listed buildings in Saighton
Listed buildings in Waverton

References
Citations

Sources

Listed buildings in Cheshire West and Chester
Lists of listed buildings in Cheshire